Merenovka is a rural locality (a selo) in Starodubsky District, Bryansk Oblast, Russia. The population was 201 as of 2010. There are 2 streets.

Geography 
Merenovka is located 6 km southeast of Starodub (the district's administrative centre) by road. Desyatukha is the nearest rural locality.

References 

Rural localities in Starodubsky District